Emil Nicholas Boures (born January 29, 1960) is a former American football player who played four seasons in the National Football League (NFL) with the Pittsburgh Steelers.

Early life
Boures was born in Bridgeport, Pennsylvania and attended Bishop Kenrick High School in Norristown, Pennsylvania.

He matriculated at the University of Pittsburgh (Pitt).

Football  career
Boures was drafted by the Pittsburgh Steelers in the seventh round of the 1982 NFL Draft.  He played for  the Steelers from 1982 through 1985 starting fourteen games in that four-year span.   He played center,  guard and  tackle on the offensive line.

Personal

References

1960 births
Living people
People from Bridgeport, Pennsylvania
Players of American football from Pennsylvania
American football offensive linemen
Pittsburgh Panthers football players
Pittsburgh Steelers players